The Shelby House is a historic building in Botkins, Ohio, United States.  Built in 1864, it was constructed by local businessman Philip Sheets as a hotel for railroad passengers originating from or destined for northern Shelby County and southern Auglaize County.  By the early twentieth century, railroad traffic had declined with the advent of the automobile, and the house was converted into an apartment building.  It remained in operation until abandonment in the 1940s; for periods of time, it housed businesses or was used as a storage building, but it never reopened as a hotel or apartment building.  Eventually, the house was purchased by the Botkins Historical Society, which converted it into a museum.
The Shelby House was added to the National Register of Historic Places in 1978; at this time, it was seen as significant both for its architecture and for its contribution to broad patterns of American history.

References

External links
 Botkins Historical Society

Hotel buildings completed in 1864
Apartment buildings in Ohio
Defunct hotels in Ohio
Historical society museums in Ohio
Hotel buildings on the National Register of Historic Places in Ohio
Buildings and structures in Shelby County, Ohio
National Register of Historic Places in Shelby County, Ohio
Railway hotels in the United States
Museums in Shelby County, Ohio